Before the Tai people's southward migration from Guangxi since the 4th century, the Indochinese peninsula had already been populated by Australo-Melanesians who by around 30,000 BP had spread into all sub-regions. They left traces of the first local culture - the Hoabinhian, a name assigned to an industry and cultural continuity of stone tools and flaked cobble artifacts that appears around 10,000 BP in caves and rock shelters first described in Hòa Bình, Vietnam, later also documented in Terengganu, Malaysia, Sumatra, Thailand, Laos, Myanmar, Cambodia and Yunnan, southern China.

Austroasiatic Mon and Khmer groups, who originate in North-Eastern India predominantly populated the riverine lowlands of Indochina since around 5000 years BP. Austronesian immigrants arrived at the coast of central modern Vietnam around 2500 BP.

The controversial Two layer hypothesis suggests the immigration of settlers arriving from the Yangtze River valley around 3,000 BP, who introduced wet-rice and millet farming techniques in Mainland Southeast Asia.

The site of Ban Chiang in North-eastern Thailand currently ranks as the earliest known center of copper and bronze production in Southeast Asia and has been dated to around 2,000 years BCE.

The oldest known records of a political entity in Indochina are attributed to Funan - centered in the Mekong Delta and comprising territories inside modern day Thailand. Chinese annals confirm Funan's existence as early as the 1st century CE, but archaeological documentation implies an extensive human settlement history since the 4th century BCE. The Langkasuka and Tambralinga kingdoms on the Malay peninsula appear in Chinese texts by the fifth century. 
As well as Funan these polities are characterized as fully developed Indianized kingdoms, which after centuries of trade and socio-economic interaction with India had adopted and incorporated elements of Indian culture, religion, statecraft, administration, epigraphy, literature and architecture.

The Mon Dvaravati principalities also appear during the middle of the first millennium in the lower Chao Phraya River valley of modern-day central Thailand. Unlike Funan, Langkasuka and Tambralinga that were situated in the center of the international trade network Dvaravati remained relatively isolated. Although distinct, the sophisticated Mon-Dvaravati culture is based on Hindu cosmology. Its characteristic art style "such as the faceted miter sitting high on the forehead ... the facial features, especially the eyes″ has influenced Thai sculpture to this day.

Indigenous states theory 
Instead of the theory of the migration from southern China, some posit an Indigenous States theory. A number of indigenous states were able to absorb foreign political and cultural influences, and forge their own distinct cultural identity.

Previously, studies on the initial state of Thai history were confined to the preconception that both its origin and existence were the results of Indian influences alone. These influences were seen as being a significant cause of early Thai states becoming a unified state with territorial power covering areas of the Indochina peninsula. Furthermore, the idea of a unified state extended to the belief that its citizens were all of Mon descent.

This theory ignored the fact that the indigenous groups already had their own political and cultural systems, although numerous and diverse, which were both individualistic and well developed. They had contacted and exchanged between the groups and then established a common culture before the advent of Indian influences.

The development of Suvarnabhumi (Thai: U-Thong, Chinese: Chinlin) and Funan from the communities to coastal centres was due to their economic and cultural interaction with seafarers from the South China Sea and the Indian Ocean. They transported both new techniques and artefacts to the various settlements in Southeast Asia. They were the main force influencing the later development of populated centres into states. They were in contact with the seafarers of Maritime Southeast Asia and became coastal centres of the trade and the cultural activities during the 2nd to 6th centuries. Together with Suvarnabhumi and Funan, Chinese records mention the states of Tun-Sun, Tan-Tan, Pan-Pan and the later states such as Chi Tu, Lang-Jia-Shu, To-Lo-Po-Ti and Lo-Hu. These records correlate with certain archaeological finds. The Roman lamp, copper coins of Victorius, atche beads, enamelled beads were found in this area. These antiques were also firmly related to the trading which linked the Eastern and Western world.

Empire of the South Sea 
By the 6th century, mariners had learnt to use the prevailing monsoons and navigate through the Straits of Malacca, which helped to shorten the journey to East Asia. This brought the Gulf of Thailand mariners into direct confrontation with their rivals, the seafarers of the Java Sea, who were already trading out of several important ports. About this time the importance of Suvarnabhumi lessened, whereas the importance of Malay Peninsula and the Indonesian archipelago appeared to grow, together with the importance of the “Empire of the South Sea”. The new network extended as far as the islands of Sumatra, Java and Sri Lanka. The area located among these land and islands became the commercial and economic base for Srivijaya as a maritime state.

The early coastal states continued to grow physically and spread inland, where they met up with more diverse cultures, which had already been through their own process of historical and cultural development. Their radiating power extended throughout the hinterland of Chao Phraya basin. There is evidence that the “Empire of the South Sea” had conquered the mainland once. Tambralinga invaded Lavo or Kingdom of Dvaravati in 903. References to the kings of Haribhunjaya, King Bakaraj (Drabaka), King Ujajitachakravard, and Javaka Raja of Tambralinga, were mentioned in these records. According to the Song's chronicle describes that San-Fo-Shih sent tribute to Chinese court by the command of King Che-Li-Wu-Ye in 961. The envoy reported the name of their kingdom was Xian-Lo-Gua.

Economy 
The import of new techniques and the growth of the initial Thai state affected agricultural production. The water buffaloes were introduced as beasts of burden instead of the oxen. This method was ideally suited for wet rice farming. Rice production increased and became an economic base for the development of the community. The people were able to develop their own economic system based on rice until they gained economic and political power over all others states in this region.

Although the international trade through the Strait of Malacca had been favoured since the 6th century, the overland routes from the coastal towns in Southern Myanmar to the port towns of central Thailand were favoured until the early Rattanakosin period. Together with the rice commerce, Sukhothai, Ayudhya and Rattanakosin became one of the trans-peninsula routes parallel with the Strait of Malacca.

Population 

The result of population movements and migrations certainly affected cultural traditions and lifestyles found among the peoples who are to populate the kingdom of Thailand. Therefore, the Thai / Sama / Sayam / Siam is the various indigenous peoples, Proto Malayu, Mon, Khmer, Champa, as well as to immigrants from India. In addition, the population also consisted of coastal peoples, some mariners, Chinese, and a host of other minority groups. This important characteristic is “The great variety” of Thai people.

Thai society and culture covered an area wider than that ruled by the state. Tai peoples refers collectively to the ethnic groups of southern China and Southeast Asia, stretching from Hainan to eastern India and from southern Sichuan to Thailand, that speak the Tai languages and share similar traditions and festivals, including Songkran. Despite never having a unified nation-state of their own, the peoples also share or historically shared a vague idea of a "Siam" nation, corrupted to Shan or Assam in some places, and most self-identify as "Tai". A far more comprehensive list is available in Thai only for this term. For example, 29 ethnic groups & languages are identified as "Tai" in the Thai language version in People's Republic of China alone. Tai peoples include:
 The Lao of Laos and Northeast Thailand
 The Northern Thai (Lanna or Thai Yuan) of Thailand
 The Thai of Thailand (Tai Noi or Little Tai)
 The Shan (Thai Yai or Big Tai) of Burma
 The Zhuang of China
 The Buyei of China
 The Thai Lue of Laos and China (also called "Dai")
 The Nùng of China, Laos, Thailand, Vietnam
 The Black Tai (Tai Dam) of Laos and Vietnam
 The Red Tai (Tai Daeng)
 The White Tai (Tai Kao)
 The Tai Dom people of present-day North Vietnam
 The various tribes in Yunnan, China.

Society 
The initial Thai society, the basic division was that between the rulers and the ruled. During this formative period, there were radical changes in the local political system. The original system of chiefdom is led by a chief was changed to a system of divine kingship based on Indian models. The king and the royal aristocracy together with the bureaucratic nobility wielded full economic and power. Next was the upper class consisting of statesmen and high officials who supervised the carrying out of state and royal duties. There were also community leaders who interacted closely with the populace.

Beneath these strata were the masses, the great majority of whom were either free men or slaves. Within this hierarchical system, each individual had a fixed status with clear-cut responsibilities and rights toward individuals above and below him. The ordinary people consisted of several groups. Every free man was the client or retainer of a person in the upper strata, while every slave was the property of an elite individual or family. The great majority of the free men were agriculturalists, townsmen and traders emerged as a result of the state being located on both continental and seafaring trading routes. The fact that it was one of the most important commercial centres in Southeast Asia can clearly be seen from the multitude of archaeological evidence found.

Religion 
The growth of the initial Thai states gradually came into a Buddhist culture instead of Shamanism. Buddhism became the core faith of early Thai society, linking up and unifying the various lifestyles and beliefs found in this region, and also played a part in determining the form of the political system. The Buddhist faith was recognised by both the state and the people. Buddhism also played an important part in the affairs of the ruling classes it was accepted in early Thai society that the king was not only the royal patron of Buddhism but also the Dharmikaraja whose duty was to spread the faith through following the righteous path as well as through the domination and subjugation of other peoples through the waging of war.

The monks partook in religious duties which were more related to the needs of the ordinary people. They taught the people how to read and write, as well as giving lessons concerning the Buddhist doctrine. While the brahmins had a direct relationship with the royalty through their ceremonial duties, the hermits and mendicants took refuge in the deep jungle, although some enjoyed various degrees of influence over politically powerful persons.

The development of Buddhism during the early Thai state period formed the basis for a Buddhist society and state in this area and provides the historical basis and origins for the later development of the kingdom of Thailand.

See also 
 Early history of Thailand
 Lavo
 Tambralinga
 Raktamaritika
 Javaka

References 

 
Indianized kingdoms